Ebba Ksour Airfield is an abandoned World War II military airfield in Tunisia, located near El Ksour, in Kef province, approximately 150 km South-West of Tunis.

The airfield was built as a temporary wartime field by Army Engineers, using Pierced Steel Planking (PSP) for runways and parking and dispersal areas, and support structures being quickly constructed out of wood or tents.  It was used briefly by the United States Army Air Forces Twelfth Air Force 33d Fighter Group between 12  April and 9 June 1943 during the North African Campaign flying P-40 Warhawks.  After the 33d moved east to Menzel Temime, the airfield was dismantled by engineers.

The precise location of the airfield is undetermined. The land around El Ksour is a mixture of desert and agriculture and the land has largely either returned to its natural state or been developed into agriculture after the war.  Today, there is little or no evidence remaining of the airfield's existence after 60 years.

References

 Maurer, Maurer. Air Force Combat Units of World War II. Maxwell AFB, Alabama: Office of Air Force History, 1983. .

External links

Airfields of the United States Army Air Forces in Tunisia
World War II airfields in Tunisia
Airports established in 1942
1942 establishments in Tunisia